The river Warta rises in central Poland and meanders greatly north-west to flow into the Oder, against the German border. It is connected to the Vistula by the Noteć and the Bydgoszcz Canal (Kanał Bydgoski) near the city of Bydgoszcz.

Course 
The Warta rises in the Kraków-Częstochowa Upland at Kromołów in Zawiercie, Silesian Voivodeship, flows through Łódź Land, Greater Poland and Lubusz Land, where it empties into the Oder near Kostrzyn at the border with Germany.

The Greater Warta Basin defines the site of early Poland; it is said that the tribe of Western Polans settled the Warta Basin between the 6th and 8th century. The river is also mentioned in the second stanza of the Polish national anthem, "Poland Is Not Yet Lost".

Towns and  Cities

Right tributaries 

 Widawka
 Ner
 Wełna
 Noteć

Left tributaries 
 Liswarta
 Prosna
 Obra
 Postomia

See also

 Rivers of Poland
 Geography of Poland
 Warta Landscape Park
 Ujście Warty National Park

References

External links 
 Warta  Poland - canoeing information (Polish)

Rivers of Poland
 
Rivers of Silesian Voivodeship
Rivers of Łódź Voivodeship
Rivers of Greater Poland Voivodeship
Rivers of Lubusz Voivodeship
Waterways in Poland